Minnamoolka is a locality in the Tablelands Region, Queensland, Australia.

Geography 
The Herbert River forms the north-east boundary of the locality while the Burdekin River forms part of the south-east boundary.

The locality is mountainous being part of the Great Dividing Range. There are numerous named peaks. The ridge of the Great Dividing Range passes through the west of the locality. This creates a watershed. Creeks which rise in the north-east of the locality flow north (Gunnawarra) and contribute eventually to the Herbert River which flows into the Hinchinbrook Channel at Macknade/Lucinda in the Shire of Hinchinbrook. Creeks which rise in the south-west are tributaries of the Burdekin which flows into the Coral Sea at Rita Island in the Shire of Burdekin. Meanwhile, the north-west of the locality contributes to the Mitchell River and the south-west to the Gilbert River, both of which flow into the Gulf of Carpentaria at Kowanyama (Aboriginal Shire of Kowanyama) and Howitt/Yagoonga (Shire of Carpentaria) respectively.

Kirrama National Park is located in the south of the locality. Part of the Forty Mile Scrub National Park is located in the north-west of the locality.

The Kennedy Developmental Road passes through the locality from the north-west (Forty Mile) to south-west (Greenvale).

Much of the land is undeveloped with some grazing on native vegetation.

Education 
There are no schools in Minnamoolka. The nearest primary schools are in Mount Garnet and Mount Surprise. The nearest secondary school is in Ravenshoe. Boarding schools and distance education are other options.

References 

Tablelands Region
Localities in Queensland